Italy competed at the 1967 European Indoor Games in Prague, Czechoslovakia, from 11 to 12 March 1967.

Medalists

Top eight

Two Italian athletes reached the top eight in this edition of the championships.
Men

Women
In this edition of the championships no women from the Italian national team participated..

See also
 Italy national athletics team

References

External links
 EAA official site 

1967
1967 European Indoor Games
1967 in Italian sport